A baker is someone who primarily bakes bread.

Baker or Bakers may also refer to:

Business and organisations
 Baker Skateboards
 Baker's Chocolate
 Baker's Drive-Thru, chain of fast-food restaurants in Southern California
 Baker Hughes, an oilfield services company
 Baker McKenzie, a law firm headquartered in Chicago
 Baker's Supermarkets, U.S. supermarket chain
 Baker's bourbon, a Jim Beam product
 Baker Publishing Group
 Baker's Biographical Dictionary of Musicians

Military
 USS Baker (DE-190), a US Navy destroyer escort in commission from 1943 to 1946
 USS Paul G. Baker, the name of more than one US Navy ship
 Baker (military code-name), a series of training exercises conducted by the US Army and several Asian countries
 Baker rifle, used by the British Army
 "Baker", event of Operation Crossroads, a nuclear weapon test series conducted by the US in 1946

People and fictional characters
 Baker (surname), including a list of people and fictional characters with the surname
 Baker Mayfield (born 1995), American football player
 Standard author abbreviation of John Gilbert Baker (1834–1920), English botanist

Places

Multiple countries 
Baker Island (disambiguation), several islands
Baker Lake (disambiguation), several lakes
Baker River (disambiguation), several rivers in North and South America
Mount Baker (disambiguation), several mountains

Iran
 Baker, Iran, a village in Fars Province
 Baker, Mamasani, a village in Fars Province

United States
 Baker, California, a census-designated place
 Baker, Kern County, California, a former unincorporated community
 a former name of Boron, California
 Baker, Florida, an unincorporated community in Okaloosa County
 Baker County, Florida
 Baker County, Georgia
 Baker, Illinois, an unincorporated community
 Baker, Indiana, an unincorporated community
 Baker, Kansas, an unincorporated community
 Baker, Louisiana, a city
 Baker, Minnesota, an unincorporated community and census-designated place
 Baker, Missouri, an inactive village
 Baker, Montana, a city
 Baker, Nebraska, a ghost town
 Baker, Nevada, a census-designated place
 Baker, North Dakota, an unincorporated community
 Baker, Oklahoma, an unincorporated community
 Baker County, Oregon
 Bakers, Tennessee, a neighborhood of Nashville
 Baker, West Virginia, an unincorporated community
 Diocese of Baker in Oregon
 Baker City, Oregon
 Mount Baker, Washington state
 Baker Mountain (Piscataquis County, Maine)
 Baker Mountain (West Virginia)
 Baker Peak (Idaho)
 Baker Peak, in the Snake Range of Nevada
 Baker Peak (Vermont), a mountain in Vermont
 Baker Township (disambiguation)

Other countries
 Bakers, Saint Peter, Barbados, a populated place in the parish of Saint Peter, Barbados
 Baker Lake (Nunavut), a body of water in Nunavut
 Baker Channel, in Chile

Other uses 
 Baker Street, London, England
 Baker University, a private, residential university in Baldwin City, Kansas, United States
 Baker House, an undergraduate dormitory at MIT
 Baker Motor Vehicle, an early 20th-century electric vehicle
 Bakers Coaches, trading name BakerBus, a bus and coach operator in Staffordshire, England
 Baker, a pickleball term
 Baker Bowl, popular name for a demolished baseball park in Philadelphia, Pennsylvania
 Baker Trail, a hiking trail in Pennsylvania

See also 
 The Baker (disambiguation)
 Baker v. Carr, a 1962 US Supreme Court case 
 Baker v. Nelson, a 1972 Minnesota Supreme Court case 
 Baker v. Vermont, a 1999 Vermont Supreme Court case 
 Baker Act, common alternate name for the Florida Mental Health Act
 Bakers Island, Massachusetts, USA
 Baker's Island, Hampshire, England
 Backer
 Bakker
 Becker (disambiguation)